Robert Kenneth "Bob" Robertson (born December 22, 1927) is a Canadian former professional ice hockey player who played 351 games in the American Hockey League for the Pittsburgh Hornets, Providence Reds, Cleveland Barons, and Quebec Aces.

External links
 

1927 births
Possibly living people
Canadian ice hockey defencemen
Cleveland Barons (1937–1973) players
Pittsburgh Hornets players
Providence Reds players
Quebec Aces (AHL) players
Sportspeople from Etobicoke
Ice hockey people from Toronto